Jack Reynor (born 23 January 1992) is an Irish-American actor. His notable roles include the films What Richard Did, Transformers: Age of Extinction, Glassland, Macbeth, Sing Street, and Midsommar, as well as the series Strange Angel and The Peripheral.

Early life
Reynor was born on 23 January 1992 in Longmont, Colorado, the son of an Irish mother and American father. He has a younger brother and sister. He initially lived in Boulder with his mother, human rights activist Tara, but moved with her to the Irish village of Valleymount when he was two years old. He attended primary school in Valleymount and spent his formative years there with his mother and maternal grandparents. His interest in acting began when he played an altar boy on the set of Country, directed by Kevin Liddy, in 1999. He moved to Dublin in 2004 to attend Belvedere College, a private Jesuit school, where he performed onstage in numerous theatrical productions.

Career

In early 2010, Reynor was cast as Robbie, "the boy next door", in the live format, unscripted Dollhouse, directed by Kirsten Sheridan, which premiered at Berlinale 2012. He depicted Richard Karlsen in Lenny Abrahamson's feature What Richard Did, which screened at the 2013 Tribeca Film Festival. The film portrays the fall of a high school rugby star and golden boy whose world unravels after his involvement in an act of careless violence. Reynor earned the Irish Film and Television Academy (IFTA) award for best actor in 2013 for his performance.

In January 2013, Reynor was cast as Shane, an Irish race car driver, in Transformers: Age of Extinction. The film was released in June 2014 and co-starred Mark Wahlberg and Nicola Peltz. It shattered worldwide box office records, making just over $1.1 billion and becoming the highest-grossing movie in Chinese history.

Days after wrapping the T4 global press tour, Reynor travelled to London to shoot Andy Serkis' Netflix film, Mowgli, alongside Christian Bale, Cate Blanchett, and Benedict Cumberbatch. The feature uses cutting-edge facial recognition technology that has been specifically invented for the project. Also that year, Reynor starred in upcoming writer/director Gerard Barrett's film Glassland with Toni Collette and Will Poulter, in which he plays a young taxi driver who struggles to instill a sense of structure in his life while his mother suffers from severe alcoholism. The film was released early 2015 and earned Reynor the World Cinema Dramatic Special Jury Award for Acting at the Sundance Film Festival. After Glassland, Reynor shot Julian Jarrold's romantic comedy, A Royal Night Out. His role opposite Sarah Gadon was the character RAF airman Jack, the young Princess Elizabeth's fictional romantic interest during the VE Day celebrations in 1945.

Reynor starred as Malcolm Canmore, the rightful heir to the throne, in the 2015 film adaptation of Macbeth, which earned an unprecedented 10-minute standing ovation at the Cannes Film Festival and premiered in Edinburgh in September 2015. Following on from the film, he next completed shooting John Carney's project playing Brendan in Sing Street, set in 1980s Dublin. It premiered at the 2016 Sundance Film Festival.

He appeared in the 2017 mini-series Philip K. Dick's Electric Dreams and the 2018 drama film On the Basis of Sex, and then starred in the 2019 horror film Midsommar. He appeared in the Amazon Prime Video series The Peripheral.

Personal life
Reynor met Irish model and actress Madeline Mulqueen in 2013, and they became engaged in March 2014. They reportedly split their time between homes in  Los Angeles, Detroit, and Ireland.

Filmography

References

External links

 

1992 births
Living people
21st-century American male actors
21st-century Irish male actors
American emigrants to Ireland
American male film actors
American male television actors
Irish expatriates in the United States
Irish male film actors
Irish male television actors
Irish people of American descent
Male actors from Colorado
Male actors from County Wicklow
People educated at Belvedere College
People from Longmont, Colorado